Nizamski rastanak is a famous Ottoman Army  melody. In English, the song has been translated as The Nizam Departure.

According to Felix Kanitz, because the melody was played by the Ottoman military orchestras when the Ottomans left Serbia in May 1867, this melody became one of the most favorite Serbian melodies. This Ottoman melody was regularly played by Serbian military orchestras during World War I and was part of an emotional reception of the victory of Serbian army on the Macedonian front. After the war, Nizamski rastanak became part of the repertoire of Serb romanticists and nationalists and was regularly sung during their gatherings.

In 1995, Benjamin Isović used the melody of "Nizamski rastanak" to write the Bosniak song "Šehidski rastanak", believing that he was only bringing back this melody to its Bosnian birthplace. Miljenko Jergović considers the Bosnian origin of the melody as completely uncertain.

References

Sources 
 

Serbian patriotic songs
Serbian soldiers
Military history of Serbia